Tandem Reconnection and Cusp Electrodynamics Reconnaissance Satellites (TRACERS) is a planned orbiter mission tasked to study the origins of the solar wind and how it affects Earth. The Principal Investigator is Craig Kletzing at the University of Iowa in Iowa City, Iowa. Not including rideshare costs, TRACERS is funded US$115 million.

Overview 

TRACERS is a pair of identical spacecraft that will be launched as a secondary mission to another orbiter named Polarimeter to Unify the Corona and Heliosphere (PUNCH) and will operate in synergy; PUNCH will study the solar wind, a stream of charged particles emanating from the Sun, while TRACERS will study Earth's response.

TRACERS will observe solar particles interacting with Earth's magnetic field at the northern magnetic cusp region. Here, the field lines guide particles from the boundary between Earth's magnetic field down into the atmosphere. In a process known as magnetic reconnection, the field lines violently reconfigure, sending particles out at speeds that can approach the speed of light. Some of these particles will be guided by the Earth's field into the region where TRACERS can observe them. TRACERS will study a longstanding question about where reconnection happens at the magnetopause and how the solar wind affects the place and timing, helping NASA better forecast the influx of energetic particles into Earth's magnetic field that has the potential to disrupt the power grid and satellite communications. TRACERS and PUNCH will work well together with the other existing heliophysics spacecraft.

On 20 June 2019, NASA announced that PUNCH and TRACERS were the winning candidates to become the next missions in the agency's Small Explorer program.

As of August 2022, TRACERS is expected to be launched in February 2024.

Instruments 
DC Magnetometer (MAG) a fluxgate magnetometer that provides measurements of the background magnetic field up to 5 Hz will be provided by University of California, Los Angeles.
A Search coil magnetometer (MSC) three-axis magnetic search coil to measure AC magnetic field from 2 Hz up to 1 kHz will be provided by University of Iowa.
An Electric Field Instrument (EFI) a two axis electric field experiment to measure electric fields from 1 Hz to 1 kHz.will be provided by University of California, Berkeley.
Analyzer for Cusp Electrons (ACE) an electrostatic analyzer to measure cusp electrons from 40 eV to 10 keV will be provided by University of Iowa.
Analyzer for Cusp Ions (ACI) is an electrostatic analyzer to measure cusp ions from 50 eV to 10 keV.

A technology demonstration, Magnetometers for Innovation and Capability (MAGIC), was added in 2020 with the goal to test prototype magnetic-field instruments.

See also 

 Heliophysics
 Magnetospheric Multiscale Mission
 Solar storm

References 

Solar space observatories
Proposed space probes
NASA space probes
Explorers Program
2024 in spaceflight
Geomagnetic satellites